October November is a 2013 Austrian drama film written and directed by Götz Spielmann. It was screened in the Contemporary World Cinema section at the 2013 Toronto International Film Festival.

Cast
 Sebastian Koch
 Andreas Ressl
 Peter Simonischek
 Ursula Strauss
 Nora von Waldstätten
 Johannes Zeiler

References

External links
 

2013 films
2013 drama films
Austrian drama films
2010s German-language films